Big City Secret is a 1952 West German crime film directed by Leo de Laforgue and starring Ingrid Lutz, Fritz Wagner, and Joachim Teege . It was shot entirely on location around Berlin, Hamburg and Dresden, partly using pre-war stock footage. It is inspired partly by the criminal Sass Brothers active in the Weimar era.

Synopsis
Two master criminals break into the vault of a bank on Berlin's Wittenbergplatz and steal a large sum. While they are apprehended soon afterwards, police have no hard evidence and have to release them. However detectives set out to hunt down the necessary evidence and bring the criminals to justice.

Cast

References

Bibliography

External links 
 

1952 films
1952 crime films
German crime films
West German films
1950s German-language films
Films directed by Leo de Laforgue
German black-and-white films
1950s German films
Films shot in Hamburg
Films shot in Berlin
Films set in Berlin